The Roman Catholic Diocese of Huehuetenango, Guatemala was first erected 22 July 1961, as the Territorial Prelature of Huehuetenango. It is a suffragan diocese of the Archdiocese of Los Altos Quetzaltenango-Totonicapán. It was elevated as a diocese on 23 December 1967.

Bishops

Ordinaries
Hugo Mark Gerbermann, M.M. (1961–1975)
Victor Hugo Martínez Contreras (1975–1987), appointed Bishop of Quetzaltenango, Los Altos
Julio Amílcar Bethancourt Fioravanti (1988–1996), appointed Bishop of Santa Rosa de Lima
Rodolfo Francisco Bobadilla Mata, C.M. (1996–2012)
Alvaro Leonel Ramazzini Imeri (since 2012), elevated to Cardinal in 2019

Auxiliary bishop
Victor Hugo Martínez Contreras (1970–1975), appointed Bishop here

External links and references

Huehuetenango
Huehuetenango
Huehuetenango
1961 establishments in Guatemala
Roman Catholic Ecclesiastical Province of Los Altos Quetzaltenango-Totonicapán